The 2003–04 NBA season was the 34th season of the National Basketball Association in Cleveland, Ohio. In the years following their 1998 first-round playoff loss to the Indiana Pacers, the Cavaliers dropped to the bottom of the league and became a perennial entrant in the annual NBA Draft Lottery. The franchise's freefall bottomed out during the 2002–03 season,  as the Cavs fell to a 17–65 record, tied with the Denver Nuggets for the league's worst.

However, the fortunes of the franchise shifted dramatically in May 2003, when the Cavs won the first overall pick in the draft lottery. The Cavaliers selected high school phenom LeBron James from St. Vincent-St. Mary High School in nearby Akron, providing the team with a centerpiece player around which to build.

The Cavaliers revised their look for the 2003–04 season, introducing a new logo and a variation on the wine and gold color scheme used by the club during the 1970s. Dark blue was also added as a trim color. Both the logo and uniforms lasted until 2010 during James' first stint in Cleveland before leaving the team to join the Miami Heat. He had controversially announced his departure from Cleveland in a nationally televised special on July 8, 2010.

The team made major moves during the season, trading Ricky Davis, Chris Mihm, Michael Stewart and a second-round draft pick to the Boston Celtics in exchange for Eric Williams, Tony Battie, and Kedrick Brown. Later, Darius Miles was traded to the Portland Trail Blazers for Jeff McInnis and Ruben Boumtje Boumtje.

The Cavaliers lost their first five games of the season, leading them to an awful 6–19 start. However, they played .500 basketball for the remainder of the season, finishing fifth in the Central Division with a 35–47 record. They fell just one game short of making the playoffs. James was named Rookie of the Year and selected to the All-Rookie First Team. Following the season, second-year forward Carlos Boozer signed as a free agent with the Utah Jazz.

Offseason
Despite James being with Cleveland for the first season, Cleveland still did not make the playoffs, still needing improvement.

Draft picks

Roster

Regular season
 Facing the Sacramento Kings in his first NBA game, LeBron James recorded 25 points, 9 assists, 6 rebounds, and 4 steals and shooting 60% from the field. After recording a season-high 41 points against the New Jersey Nets, James became the youngest player in league history to score 40 points in a game. He averaged 20.9 points, 5.9 assists, and 5.5 rebounds per game for the season, and was named Rookie of the Year; becoming the first Cavalier and youngest NBA player to ever receive the award. He joined Oscar Robertson and Michael Jordan as the only three players in NBA history to average at least 20 points, 5 rebounds, and 5 assists per game in their rookie season. The Cavaliers improved by 18 wins and concluded the regular season with a 35–47 record, but failed to make the playoffs.

Standings

Record vs. opponents

Game log

|-style="background:#fcc;"
| 1
| October 29
| @ Sacramento
| 
| LeBron James (25)
| Carlos Boozer (11)
| LeBron James (9)
| ARCO Arena17,317
| 0–1
|-style="background:#fcc;"
| 2
| October 30
| @ Phoenix
| 
| Ricky Davis (22)
| Carlos Boozer (14)
| LeBron James (8)
| America West Arena18,422
| 0–2

|-style="background:#fcc;"
| 3
| November 1
| @ Portland
| 
| Zydrunas Ilgauskas (21)
| Carlos Boozer (9)
| Ricky Davis (7)
| Rose Garden20,610
| 0–3
|-style="background:#fcc;"
| 4
| November 5
| Denver
| 
| Zydrunas Ilgauskas (23)
| LeBron James (11)
| James, Ollie (7)
| Gund Arena20,562
| 0–4
|-style="background:#fcc;"
| 5
| November 7
| @ Indiana
| 
| LeBron James (23)
| Ricky Davis (12)
| Ricky Davis (10)
| Conseco Fieldhouse18,345
| 0–5
|-style="background:#cfc;"
| 6
| November 8
| Washington
| 
| Miles, Davis (26)
| James, Davis, Boozer (8)
| LeBron James (9)
| Gund Arena17,706
| 1–5
|-style="background:#cfc;"
| 7
| November 10
| New York
| 
| Chris Mihm (19)
| Carlos Boozer (8)
| Ricky Davis (8)
| Gund Arena16,422
| 2–5
|-style="background:#fcc;"
| 8
| November 12
| @ Miami
| 
| Zydrunas Ilgauskas (20)
| Carlos Boozer (16)
| LeBron James (7)
| American Airlines Arena15,329
| 2–6
|-style="background:#fcc;"
| 9
| November 14
| @ Boston
| 
| Zydrunas Ilgauskas (22)
| Carlos Boozer (11)
| Ricky Davis (6)
| FleetCenter18,624
| 2–7
|-style="background:#cfc;"
| 10
| November 15
| Philadelphia
| 
| Zydrunas Ilgauskas (28)
| Carlos Boozer (15)
| LeBron James (8)
| Gund Arena20,562
| 3–7
|-style="background:#cfc;"
| 11
| November 18
| L.A. Clippers
| 
| Ricky Davis (27)
| Zydrunas Ilgauskas (10)
| LeBron James (8)
| Gund Arena16,176
| 4–7
|-style="background:#fcc;"
| 12
| November 19
| @ Washington
| 
| LeBron James (28)
| Chris Mihm (12)
| James, Ollie (8)
| MCI Center19,705
| 4–8
|-style="background:#fcc;"
| 13
| November 21
| Minnesota
| 
| LeBron James (19)
| Zydrunas Ilgauskas (12)
| Ricky Davis (6)
| Gund Arena19,269
| 4–9
|-style="background:#fcc;"
| 14
| November 22
| @ Atlanta
| 
| Zydrunas Ilgauskas (21)
| Zydrunas Ilgauskas (10)
| Ricky Davis (6)
| Philips Arena19,445
| 4–10
|-style="background:#fcc;"
| 15
| November 26
| @ New Orleans
| 
| Zydrunas Ilgauskas (20)
| James, Mihm (8)
| LeBron James (9)
| New Orleans Arena16,410
| 4–11
|-style="background:#fcc;"
| 16
| November 28
| @ Detroit
| 
| Ricky Davis (25)
| Chris Mihm (13)
| LeBron James (7)
| The Palace of Auburn Hills22,076
| 4–12
|-style="background:#fcc;"
| 17
| November 29
| Memphis
| 
| LeBron James (33)
| LeBron James (16)
| James, Davis (7)
| Gund Arena18,102
| 4–13

|-style="background:#fcc;"
| 18
| December 2
| @ Denver
| 
| LeBron James (19)
| Zydrunas Ilgauskas (13)
| Davis, James (5)
| Pepsi Center19,610
| 4–14
|-style="background:#fcc;"
| 19
| December 3
| @ L.A. Clippers
| 
| Zydrunas Ilgauskas (24)
| Carlos Boozer (21)
| LeBron James (8)
| Staples Center17,445
| 4–15
|-style="background:#cfc;"
| 20
| December 6
| Atlanta
| 
| Zydrunas Ilgauskas (19)
| Carlos Boozer (10)
| LeBron James (5)
| Gund Arena17,390
| 5–15
|-style="background:#fcc;"
| 21
| December 9
| Toronto
| 
| LeBron James (18)
| Ira Newble (10)
| Ricky Davis (6)
| Gund Arena16,139
| 5–16
|-style="background:#cfc;"
| 22
| December 11
| Detroit
| 
| Carlos Boozer (28)
| Chris Mihm (10)
| LeBron James (9)
| Gund Arena15,115
| 6–16
|-style="background:#fcc;"
| 23
| December 13
| Boston
| 
| LeBron James (37)
| Carlos Boozer (15)
| Ricky Davis (8)
| Gund Arena17,353
| 6–17
|-style="background:#fcc;"
| 24
| December 15
| @ Indiana
| 
| LeBron James (27)
| Zydrunas Ilgauskas (7)
| LeBron James (6)
| Conseco Fieldhouse14,951
| 6–18
|-style="background:#fcc;"
| 25
| December 17
| Houston
| 
| Zydrunas Ilgauskas (19)
| Carlos Boozer (11)
| Kevin Ollie (6)
| Gund Arena14,567
| 6–19
|-style="background:#cfc;"
| 26
| December 19
| @ Philadelphia
| 
| LeBron James (36)
| Zydrunas Ilgauskas (9)
| Kevin Ollie (12)
| Wachovia Center20,761
| 7–19
|-style="background:#cfc;"
| 27
| December 20
| @ Chicago
| 
| LeBron James (32)
| Zydrunas Ilgauskas (12)
| LeBron James (10)
| United Center22,282
| 8–19
|-style="background:#cfc;"
| 28
| December 23
| New Orleans
| 
| LeBron James (22)
| Carlos Boozer (14)
| J. R. Bremer (4)
| Gund Arena16,609
| 9–19
|-style="background:#fcc;"
| 29
| December 25
| @ Orlando
| 
| LeBron James (34)
| Carlos Boozer (19)
| LeBron James (6)
| TD Waterhouse Centre17,283
| 9–20
|-style="background:#fcc;"
| 30
| December 26
| Chicago
| 
| LeBron James (18)
| Carlos Boozer (14)
| Darius Miles (5)
| Gund Arena20,562
| 9–21
|-style="background:#cfc;"
| 31
| December 28
| Portland
| 
| LeBron James (32)
| Carlos Boozer (13)
| LeBron James (9)
| Gund Arena18,109
| 10–21
|-style="background:#fcc;"
| 32
| December 30
| Indiana
| 
| LeBron James (22)
| Carlos Boozer (11)
| Carlos Boozer (6)
| Gund Arena18,648
| 10–22

|-style="background:#fcc;"
| 33
| January 2
| @ New Jersey
| 
| Carlos Boozer (16)
| Carlos Boozer (13)
| LeBron James (9)
| Continental Airlines Arena19,968
| 10–23
|-style="background:#cfc;"
| 34
| January 6
| New York
| 
| Zydrunas Ilgauskas (24)
| Tony Battie (8)
| LeBron James (10)
| Gund Arena15,277
| 11–23
|-style="background:#fcc;"
| 35
| January 7
| @ Toronto
| 
| LeBron James (21)
| Zydrunas Ilgauskas (12)
| LeBron James (5)
| Air Canada Centre19,874
| 11–24
|-style="background:#fcc;"
| 36
| January 9
| @ Boston
| 
| LeBron James (19)
| Tony Battie (13)
| LeBrob James (6)
| FleetCenter18,624
| 11–25
|-style="background:#fcc;"
| 37
| January 12
| @ L.A. Lakers
| 
| Zydrunas Ilgauskas (19)
| Carlos Boozer (12)
| LeBron James (7)
| Staples Center18,997
| 11–26
|-style="background:#cfc;"
| 38
| January 13
| @ Seattle
| 
| LeBron James (27)
| Zydrunas Ilgauskas (10)
| LeBron James (9)
| KeyArena17,072
| 12–26
|-style="background:#fcc;"
| 39
| January 15
| @ Golden State
| 
| LeBron James (29)
| Carlos Boozer (10)
| LeBron James (6)
| The Arena in Oakland19,602
| 12–27
|-style="background:#cfc;"
| 40
| January 17
| @ Utah
| 
| Carlos Boozer (32)
| Carlos Boozer (18)
| Eric Williams (5)
| Delta Center19,622
| 13–27
|-style="background:#cfc;"
| 41
| January 20
| Seattle
| 
| Carlos Boozer (32)
| Carlos Boozer (20)
| Carlos Boozer (4)
| Gund Arena14,048
| 14–27
|-style="background:#fcc;"
| 42
| January 22
| Sacramento
| 
| Dajuan Wagner (20)
| Carlos Boozer (11)
| Kevin Ollie (9)
| Gund Arena17,720
| 14–28
|-style="background:#cfc;"
| 43
| January 24
| Philadelphia
| 
| Eric Williams (20)
| Carlos Boozer (15)
| Jeff McInnis (6)
| Gund Arena20,562
| 15–28
|-style="background:#cfc;"
| 44
| January 26
| Orlando
| 
| Carlos Boozer (23)
| Carlos Boozer (16)
| Jeff McInnis (7)
| Gund Arena14,382
| 16–28
|-style="background:#cfc;"
| 45
| January 28
| Miami
| 
| Zydrunas Ilgauskas (30)
| Zydrunas Ilgauskas (11)
| Jeff McInnis (8)
| Gund Arena14,433
| 17–28
|-style="background:#fcc;"
| 46
| January 30
| @ Milwaukee
| 
| LeBron James (20)
| Zydrunas Ilgauskas (11)
| Jeff McInnis (5)
| Bradley Center18,717
| 17–29

|-style="background:#cfc;"
| 47
| February 1
| @ Washington
| 
| LeBron James (38)
| Carlos Boozer (14)
| Jeff McInnis (9)
| MCI Center15,541
| 18–29
|-style="background:#cfc;"
| 48
| February 3
| @ Detroit
| 
| Carlos Booxer (21)
| Carlos Boozer (15)
| LeBron James (6)
| The Palace of Auburn Hills22,076
| 19–29
|-style="background:#fcc;"
| 49
| February 4
| L.A. Lakers
| 
| LeBron James (32)
| Carlos Boozer (16)
| Carlos Boozer (7)
| Gund Arena20,562
| 19–30
|-style="background:#fcc;"
| 50
| February 6
| @ Minnesota
| 
| Jeff McInnis (21)
| James, Boozer (9)
| James, McInnis (5)
| Target Center19,212
| 19–31
|-style="background:#fcc;"
| 51
| February 7
| Washington
| 
| Carlos Boozer (19)
| Zydrunas Ilgauskas (11)
| LeBron James (6)
| Gund Arena20,562
| 19–32
|-style="background:#cfc;"
| 52
| February 9
| Boston
| 
| LeBron James (24)
| Zydrunas Ilgauskas (16)
| Jeff McInnis (9)
| Gund Arena15,146
| 20–32
|-style="background:#fcc;"
| 53
| February 11
| New Jersey
| 
| Eric Williams (14)
| Zydrunas Ilgauskas (17)
| McInnis, James (5)
| Gund Arena15,074
| 20–33
|-style="background:#fcc;"
| 54
| February 18
| Dallas
| 
| Carlos Boozer (24)
| Carlos Boozer (14)
| LeBron James (9)
| Gund Arena18,349
| 20–34
|-style="background:#cfc;"
| 55
| February 20
| San Antonio
| 
| LeBron James (32)
| Zydrunas Ilgauskas (12)
| Jeff McInnis (8)
| Gund Arena20,562
| 21–34
|-style="background:#cfc;"
| 56
| February 22
| @ New York
| 
| Zydrunas Ilgauskas (31)
| Carlos Boozer (17)
| Jeff McInnis (4)
| Madison Square Garden19,763
| 22–34
|-style="background:#cfc;"
| 57
| February 23
| New Orleans
| 
| Carlos Boozer (24)
| Carlos Boozer (9)
| Jeff McInnis (9)
| Gund Arena17,093
| 23–34
|-style="background:#fcc;"
| 58
| February 25
| @ Houston
| 
| McInnins, Ilgauskas (17)
| Carlos Boozer (18)
| Jeff McInnis (10)
| Toyota Center18,184
| 23–35
|-style="background:#cfc;"
| 59
| February 27
| @ Orlando
| 
| LeBron James (30)
| Carlos Boozer (16)
| Jeff McInnis (10)
| TD Waterhouse Centre17,283
| 24–35

|-style="background:#fcc;"
| 60
| March 1
| @ Chicago
| 
| Zydrunas Ilgauskas (19)
| Carlos Boozer (13)
| Jeff McInnis (6)
| United Center19,203
| 24–36
|-style="background:#cfc;"
| 61
| March 3
| Atlanta
| 
| LeBron James (24)
| Carlos Boozer (15)
| Jeff McInnis (9)
| Gund Arena20,562
| 25–36
|-style="background:#cfc;"
| 62
| March 5
| @ New Orleans
| 
| LeBron James (19)
| Eric Williams (11)
| Jeff McInnis (11)
| New Orleans Arena17,795
| 26–36
|-style="background:#cfc;"
| 63
| March 6
| Milwaukee
| 
| Zydrunas Ilgauskas (29)
| Carlos Boozer (13)
| Jeff McInnis (12)
| Gund Arena20,562
| 27–36
|-style="background:#cfc;"
| 64
| March 8
| @ Atlanta
| 
| LeBron James (34)
| Carlos Boozer (11)
| Jeff McInnis (10)
| Philips Arena14,050
| 28–36
|-style="background:#cfc;"
| 65
| March 10
| @ Toronto
| 
| Zydrunas Ilgauskas (30)
| Carlos Boozer (13)
| Jeff McInnis (7)
| Air Canada Centre17,459
| 29–36
|-style="background:#cfc;"
| 66
| March 14
| Indiana
| 
| LeBron James (26)
| Boozer, Ilgauskas (9)
| Jeff McInnis (10)
| Gund Arena20,562
| 30–36
|-style="background:#cfc;"
| 67
| March 16
| Chicago
| 
| Zydrunas Ilgauskas (24)
| Zydrunas Ilgauskas (17)
| LeBron James (8)
| Gund Arena17,776
| 31–36
|-style="background:#fcc;"
| 68
| March 19
| Utah
| 
| Zydrunas Ilgauskas (24)
| Carlos Boozer (13)
| LeBron James (7)
| Gund Arena20,562
| 31–37
|-style="background:#fcc;"
| 69
| March 21
| Detroit
| 
| Carlos Boozer (21)
| Carlos Boozer (17)
| Kevin Ollie (8)
| Gund Arena20,562
| 31–38
|-style="background:#fcc;"
| 70
| March 23
| Phoenix
| 
| LeBron James (25)
| Carlos Boozer (14)
| LeBron James (6)
| Gund Arena19,024
| 31–39
|-style="background:#fcc;"
| 71
| March 26
| @ Philadelphia
| 
| LeBron James (16)
| Carlos Boozer (11)
| LeBron James (7)
| Wachovia Center20,804
| 31–40
|-style="background:#cfc;"
| 72
| March 27
| New Jersey
| 
| LeBron James (41)
| Carlos Boozer (11)
| LeBron James (13)
| Gund Arena20,562
| 32–40
|-style="background:#fcc;"
| 73
| March 29
| @ San Antonio
| 
| James, Ilgauskas (18)
| Ilgauskas, Diop (6)
| Ollie, Battie (5)
| SBC Center18,797
| 32–41
|-style="background:#fcc;"
| 74
| March 30
| @ Dallas
| 
| LeBron James (28)
| Carlos Boozer (20)
| James, Ollie, Cleaves (6)
| American Airlines Center20,575
| 32–42

|-style="background:#fcc;"
| 75
| April 2
| @ Milwaukee
| 
| Carlos Boozer (26)
| Carlos Boozer (11)
| Mateen Cleaves (8)
| Bradley Center17,813
| 32–43
|-style="background:#fcc;"
| 76
| April 3
| Golden State
| 
| LeBron James (34)
| Carlos Boozer (13)
| LeBron James (10)
| Gund Arena20,562
| 32–44
|-style="background:#fcc;"
| 77
| April 6
| Toronto
| 
| LeBron James (21)
| Boozer, Ilgauskas (15)
| Jeff McInnis (10)
| Gund Arena20,071
| 32–45
|-style="background:#fcc;"
| 78
| April 7
| @ Memphis
| 
| Dajuan Wagner (18)
| Carlos Boozer (8)
| Jeff McInnis (6)
| Pyramid Arena19,351
| 32–46
|-style="background:#fcc;"
| 79
| April 9
| @ Miami
| 
| LeBron James (24)
| James, Ilgauskas (7)
| LeBron James (8)
| American Airlines Arena20,213
| 32–47
|-style="background:#cfc;"
| 80
| April 10
| Miami
| 
| Jeff McInnis (16)
| Carlos Boozer (14)
| LeBron James (11)
| Gund Arena20,562
| 33–47
|-style="background:#cfc;"
| 81
| April 12
| Milwaukee
| 
| LeBron James (27)
| Zydrunas Ilgauskas (14)
| LeBron James (9)
| Gund Arena20,562
| 34–47
|-style="background:#cfc;"
| 82
| April 14
| @ New York
| 
| Jeff McInnis (19)
| Carlos Boozer (12)
| Jeff McInnis (7)
| Madison Square Garden19,763
| 35–47

Player stats

Regular season

* Statistics include only games with the Cavaliers

Award winners
 LeBron James, Small Forward, Rookie of the Year
 LeBron James, Small Forward, NBA All-Rookie First Team

References

 Cleveland Cavaliers on Database Basketball
 Cleveland Cavaliers on Basketball Reference

Cleveland Cavaliers seasons
Cleve
Cleveland Cavaliers
Cleveland Cavaliers